Ells was an unincorporated community in Crawford County, in the U.S. state of Iowa. Today it is a ghost town.

History

Ells was a village in Stockholm Township, Crawford County, Iowa, platted in either 1899 or 1900. A post office was established in Ells on January 24, 1900 by Benjamin F. Ells. News of the new post office appeared in the Daily Iowa Capital in Des Moines on February 15, 1900.

Ells, located one mile south of Boyer, was on the Illinois Central Railroad and had a train depot and general store in 1911. Benjamin Ells served as the postmaster, appointed by President William McKinley.

The post office at Ells was discontinued April 15, 1914.In 1915, the population of Ells was 26. Today, Crawford County residents consider Ells a "lost" town.

Further reading
Lees, James H. The History of Boyer Valley (1919)

References

See also
Old Kiron, Iowa, another ghost town in Stockholm Township

Unincorporated communities in Crawford County, Iowa
Unincorporated communities in Iowa